This is a list of Swedish place names in the United States. Many places in the United States, especially smaller ones, have been named after Sweden-related topics.

Alabama
Silverhill
Thorsby

California
 Arboga
 Jenny Lind
Kingsburg

Delaware
Christina River

Idaho
New Sweden

Illinois
Andover
Bishop Hill
Bishop Hill Colony
Galva

Indiana
Nora

Iowa
Boxholm
Calmar (Kalmar)
Stockholm

Kansas
Falun
Lindsborg

Kentucky
Sweeden

Maine
Jemtland (Jämtland)
New Sweden
Stockholm
Sweden
Westmanland (Västmanland)

Michigan
Skandia Township

Minnesota
Almelund
Borgholm
Falun Township
Kalmar Township
Karlstad
Larsmont
Lindstrom
Malmo Township
Malung
Mora
New Sweden
New Sweden Township
Ronneby
Scandia
Stark
Stockholm Township
Svea Township
Tegner
Upsala

Nebraska
Gothenburg (Göteborg)
Malmo (Malmö)
Swedehome

Nevada
Lund

New Jersey
Stockholm
Swedesboro

New York
Dannemora (town)
Dannemora (village)
Stockholm
Sweden
Taberg

North Dakota
Svea

Pennsylvania
Sweden Township

South Dakota
Stockholm
Norbeck

Texas
New Sweden

Washington
Carlsborg (Karlsborg)
Venersborg, Washington (Vänersborg)

Wisconsin 
Lund
 Stockholm (village)
Stockholm (town)
West Sweden (town)

See also
 List of non-US places that have a US place named after them

References

Swedish
Swedish-American history